Vince Sheehan (?–1926) was an Australian rugby league footballer who played in the 1910s and 1920s.  He played for South Sydney in the New South Wales Rugby League (NSWRL) competition.

Playing career
Sheehan made his first grade debut for South Sydney in round 9 of the 1917 season against Annandale at Wentworth Park.  

In 1918, Sheehan played eight games and scored five tries as South Sydney won the premiership that year.  In 1919, he was selected to play for New South Wales and made one appearance where he scored two tries against Queensland.  He was selected for New South Wales to tour New Zealand but broke his collar bone on the eve of the trip.  

Sheehan retired following the conclusion of the 1922 season.

References

1926 deaths
South Sydney Rabbitohs players
Australian rugby league players
Rugby league players from Sydney
Rugby league wingers
Rugby league centres
New South Wales rugby league team players